Guilielmus Messaus (or Messaulx, Missau) (bapt. 2 July 1589 – 8 March 1640) was a Flemish composer who was born and died in Antwerp.

Between 1609 and 1610 he was a sacristan of St. Joris and in 1613 he became a schoolmaster and sacristan at St. Wllibrordus. From 1614 to 1618 he was also a teacher at St Walburgis and St Andries, but was dismissed for bad behaviour. From before 1620 he was a singer and a choir-master at St Walburgis, a post he held until his death. We know this because in 1620 he was temporarily suspended due to refusing to perform a plainchant mass instead of a polyphonic one for the burial of a child.

Messaus composed at least 14 masses, 57 motets, Dutch hymns, a canon and 3 secular songs in Dutch. He is now remembered mostly as a very productive musical arranger of cantiones natalitiae (Christmas songs), which were very popular in the Low Countries. He was also an active copyist of motets and harpsichord music.

External links

Biography on Grove Music Online

1589 births
1640 deaths
17th-century classical composers
Belgian Baroque composers
Belgian classical composers
Belgian male classical composers
Flemish composers
Musicians from Antwerp
17th-century male musicians